Casey Ruggles is a Western comic strip written and drawn by Warren Tufts that ran from May 22, 1949, to October 30, 1955.

Publication history
The Sunday strip was launched May 22, 1949, and the daily strip on September 19, 1949. Until 1950, the Sunday strip and the daily strip both told the same story.

Tufts' ghost artists and assistants were Al Plastino, Edmond Good, Alex Toth and Ruben Moreira. Tufts did not write or draw the Sunday strip between August 31, 1953, and January 30, 1954. The last Tufts' daily was April 3, 1954, and his last Sunday was on September 5, 1954.

The strip continued for a short while with Al Carreño as artist and writer.

Characters and story
Casey Ruggles was an Old West adventurer in California during the Gold Rush. A former sergeant in the U.S. Army, he encountered such historical figures as Kit Carson, William G. Fargo, Millard Fillmore, Jean Lafitte, and Henry Wells.

Episode guide
 daily and Sunday
 The Trek to California
 daily 1950
 Black Barney
 The Hard Times of Pancho and Pecos
 Aquila
 The Spanish Mine
 The Whisperer
 The Pomo Uprising

 daily 1951
 Old Ancient
 In Old Los Angeles
 King of the Horsemen
 Juan Soto
 Jenny
 daily 1952
 Sidney Town
 Death Valley Gold
 The Growlersburgh Church
 The Babysitter
 Smiley Sweet
 Miss Hawks
 daily 1953
 A Real Nice Guy
 The Marchioness of Grofnek
 The Highwayman
 Leaves of Strength
 The Spanish Pearl Galleon
 Santy Claus
 daily 1954
 The Willits Family
 Penelope's Gold

 Sunday stories
 1950
 The Emperor of Tilly Valley
 Murietta
 1951
 Silver Belle
 The Return of Black Barney
 Captain Beauregarde
 The Fairy Godmother
 1952
 Apache Convention
 The Trial of Kit Fox
 Wedding Bells
 River Steamboat War
 1953
 Yagali
 A Man of Peace
 1954
 The California Express Co.
 Spanish Doubloons

Reprints 
All of the daily stories by Warren Tufts have been reprinted by Pacific Comics Club or Comics Revue. Comics Revue has also reprinted all of the Sunday's by Warren Tufts through 7 JUNE 1953. The early dailies and Sundays have been reprinted in hardback by Classic Comics Press; two more volumes are planned.

References

Further reading
 Yeo, Henry, A Warren Tufts Retrospective, Western Wind, 1980.

1949 comics debuts
1954 comics endings
Ruggles, Casey
American comic strips
Ruggles, Casey
Ruggles, Casey
Ruggles, Casey
Western (genre) comics
Western (genre) heroes and heroines